The GR 92 is part of the extensive GR footpath network of paths, tracks and trails in Spain. It will eventually run the length of the Mediterranean coast of Spain, from Portbou, on the border with France to Tarifa, the most southerly point of Spain. In doing so it will pass through the autonomous communities of Catalonia, Valencia, Murcia and Andalusia. The sections in Catalunya and Murcia are complete and fully signposted, but work is still in progress on the sections in Valencia and Andalusia, and sources differ on the eventual length of the path.

The GR 92 forms the southern portion of the E10, one of the European long-distance paths. The E10 runs between Finland and Spain.

GR 92 in Catalonia
The northern-most of these stages, running through the Costa Brava, were in part adapted from the Camí de Ronda, a path originally constructed to help control the coast and stop smuggling.

The stages are:

GR92 in Valencia 
The section of the GR 92 in Valencia runs from Traiguera to Pilar de la Horadada.

GR92 in Murcia 
The section is broken down into 9 stages as follows:

GR92 in Andalucia 
The section of the GR 92 in Andalucia runs from San Juan De Los Terreros to Tarifa. Only sections of the path are defined or way marked.

References

Hiking trails in Spain